Esther Renay Dean (born April  15, 1986) is an American singer, songwriter, music producer and actress. Dean has also written songs for many artists, with numerous Top 10 hits, including No. 1 hits for Rihanna and Katy Perry, earning the name "The Song Factory". At the 54th Annual Grammy Awards, Dean was nominated for Album of the Year as a producer on Rihanna's album Loud. Outside of music, she voiced two of the characters in the fourth film in the Ice Age franchise, Ice Age: Continental Drift, and also wrote a song for the movie, titled "We Are (Family)". Dean made her acting debut in the film Pitch Perfect (2012) as Cynthia-Rose Adams, a role she reprised for the sequels, Pitch Perfect 2 (2015) and Pitch Perfect 3 (2017).

Life and career
Born in Muskogee, Oklahoma, and raised in Tulsa, Oklahoma, Ester Dean is the youngest of five children brought up by their single mother Hester, in a low-income household.  At a young age Dean learned how to channel her energy into her music, writing and channeling her emotions into songs. Creative writing served as Dean’s self-therapy.
  At the age of 15, her mother moved Ester and Deandria to Omaha, Nebraska. Leaving her older siblings in Tulsa, Oklahoma, the separation made Ester again dig deeper for a connection, drawing her closer to the music and the music industry. Singing in every studio and writing for local Omaha rappers and producers, Ester unknowingly grass-rooted herself. Learning the ends and outs of her talent and creativity, at 20 years old Esther made a bold move, packed her bags and left Omaha with only $500 in her pocket. She drove 18 hours alone to Atlanta Georgia, to crack into the music industry.   She sang for anyone who would listen.  While at a Gap Band concert, music producer Tricky Stewart overheard Dean singing in the crowd along with the band. He immediately asked her to set up a meeting. While going through her catalog of songs, Tricky was impressed by not only her voice but also her songwriting ability.  He signed her to a small publishing deal that allowed Dean to grow and connect with other known writers and producers.  This opportunity provided Dean with the tools, tricks, and skills to writing potential Top 40 songs.

Although her time with Tricky was a significant point in her career, Dean eventually parted ways and relocated to Los Angeles, California.

Upon relocating to Los Angeles, Dean began to build a name in the songwriting world.  She was eventually introduced to Polow da Don, and later signed to Zone 4 Records/Interscope Records.

In 2009 Dean released her first single, "Drop It Low", which peaked at number 38 on the US Billboard Hot 100, becoming her first US Top 40 single.

Dean's big break came when she collaborated with super producers Stargate, creating her first number one single, Rihanna’s "Rude Boy".  She went on to write "What's My Name", "Where Have You Been" and several other Rihanna hits, as well as Katy Perry's "Firework" and Nicki Minaj’s "Super Bass" and co-writing "Pills n Potions" with Nicki Minaj.

In 2011, Dean contributed to the soundtrack for the animated film, Rio by Blue Sky Studios.

In 2012, Dean was named ‘The Song Machine’ in an article by John Seabrook. She has written, and sometimes produced, Top 40 hits for artists including Rihanna, Christina Aguilera, Florence + The Machine, Beyoncé, Drake, Selena Gomez, Mary J. Blige, Kelly Clarkson, Ciara, The Pussycat Dolls, Usher, Kelly Rowland, R. Kelly, Britney Spears, Lil Wayne, and Eurovision Song Contest 2012 winner Loreen.

She appeared as Cynthia Rose in Pitch Perfect, released in 2012, and reprised the role in the sequels Pitch Perfect 2 (2015) and Pitch Perfect 3 (2017).

She is on the jury panel for American Song Contest representing Oklahoma. The competition begins March 21, 2022 on NBC.

Artistry

Voice
Dean possesses a mezzo-soprano range. Her vocals were described by Billboard as "raw, energetic vocals [that] cover a wide range: from club banger to melodic doo-wop/hip-hop." Dean's vocals have also been described as similar to Rihanna and Nicki Minaj. "The songwriter's voice is pitched dead center between two artists. The first is frequent collaborator Rihanna...the other is Nicki Minaj when she sings."

Songwriting style
In a 2012 article in The New Yorker, Dean described her preferred method of songwriting: "I go into the booth and I scream and I sing and I yell, and sometimes it's words but most time [sic] it's not...and I just see when I get this little chill [on her upper arm, below the shoulder] and then I'm, like, 'Yeah, that's the hook.'"

Filmography

Film

Television

Discography

Accolades 

{| class="wikitable"
|-
!Year
!Ceremony
!Nominated Work
!Category
!Result
!
|-
!rowspan="4" |2011
|rowspan="4" |BMI R&B/Hip-Hop Awards
|"Hot Tottie" (as a writer)
|rowspan="4" |Award-Winning Urban Songs
|
|rowspan="4" |
|-
|"I Am" (as a writer)
|
|-
|"Rude Boy" (as a writer)
|
|-
|"Sex Therapy" (as a writer)
|
|-
! rowspan="11" |2012
|Grammy Awards
|Loud (as a producer and writer)
|Album of the Year 
|
|
|-
|rowspan="7" |BMI Pop Awards
|Herself
|Songwriter of the Year
|
|rowspan="7" |
|-
|rowspan="2" |"Firework" (as a writer)
|Pop Song of the Year
|
|-
|rowspan="5" |Award-Winning Pop Songs
|
|-
|"Super Bass" (as a writer)
|
|-
|"Rude Boy" (as a writer)
|
|-
|"S&M" (as a writer)
|
|-
|"What's My Name?" (as a writer)
|
|-
|rowspan="3" |BMI R&B/Hip-Hop Awards
|rowspan="2" |"Super Bass" (as a writer)
|Urban Song of the Year
|
|rowspan="3" |
|-
|rowspan="2" |Award-Winning Urban Songs
|
|-
|"What's My Name?" (as a writer)
|
|-
! rowspan="5" |2013
|rowspan="3" |BMI Pop Awards
|"Mr. Know It All" (as a writer)
|rowspan="3" |Award-Winning Pop Songs
|
|rowspan="3" |
|-
|"Turn Me On" (as a writer)
|
|-
|"Where Have You Been" (as a writer)
|
|-
|MTV Movie Awards
|Pitch Perfect (shared with the cast)
|Best Musical Moment 
|
|
|-
|Annie Awards
|Ice Age: Continental Drift (as a producer)
|Best Music in a Feature Production
|
|
|-
! rowspan="1" |2015
|Hollywood Music in Media Awards
|"Dancing in the Dark" (as a writer)
|Best Song – Animated Film 
|
|
|-
!rowspan="3" |2016
|rowspan="2" |BMI London Awards
|rowspan="3" |"Hey Mama" (as a writer)
|Dance Award
|
|rowspan="2" |
|-
|Award-Winning Pop Songs
|
|-
|rowspan="1" |BMI Pop Awards
|Award-Winning Pop Songs
|
|
|-
|rowspan="1" |2021
|Canadian Country Music Awards
|"Champagne Night" (as a writer)
|Songwriter of the Year
|
|

References

External links
 
 

1986 births
Living people
African-American women singer-songwriters
American contemporary R&B singers
American dance musicians
American women hip hop musicians
American hip hop singers
American mezzo-sopranos
American women pop singers
American women record producers
Record producers from Oklahoma
Roc Nation artists
21st-century African-American women singers
Singers from Oklahoma
Songwriters from Oklahoma